is a 1996 Japanese historical television series. It is the 35th NHK taiga drama television series.

Plot
The story chronicles the life of Toyotomi Hideyoshi.

Production

Production Credits
Original – Taichi Sakaiya
Music – Reijirō Koroku
Titling – Hisaya Morishige
Narrator – Etsuko Ichihara, Ryuji Miyamoto
Historical research – Tetsuo Owada
Sword fight arranger - Kunishirō Hayashi

Cast
Starring role
Naoto Takenaka as Hideyoshi

Toyotomi clan
Yasuko Sawaguchi as One - wife of Hideyoshi
Etsuko Ichihara as Naka - mother of Hideyoshi
Ichiro Zaitsu as Chikuami - stepfather of Hideyoshi
Masanobu Takashima as Toyotomi Hidenaga - younger brother of Hideyoshi
Naomi Hosokawa as Sato - younger sister of Hideyoshi
Takako Matsu as Cha-cha - concubine of Hideyoshi
Hiroyuki Sanada as Ishida Mitsunari
Shun Oguri as Ishida Mitsunari (teenager)
Atsushi Onita as Hachisuka Masakatsu
Ikkō Furuya as Takenaka Hanbei
Masatō Ibu as Kuroda Kanbei
Yosuke Asari as young Ukita Hideie

Oda clan
Tetsuya Watari as Oda Nobunaga
Hiroaki Murakami as Akechi Mitsuhide
Narimi Arimori as Tsumaki Hiroko - wife of Mitsuhide
Yōko Nogiwa as Omaki no kata - mother of Mitsuhide
Eriko Tamura as Akechi Tama
Mitsuko Yorichika as Oichi - younger sister of Nobunaga
Akira Nakao as Shibata Katsuie
Yasunori Danta as Takigawa Kazumasu
Saburō Shinoda as Niwa Nagahide
Masahiro Matsuoka as Mori Ranmaru
Hideo Takamatsu as Hayashi Sado no Kami
Samy Pop as Yasuke
Junkichi Orimoto as Sakuma Nobumori
Tōru Watanabe as Maeda Toshiie
Azusa Nakamura as Maeda Matsu

Tokugawa clan
Masahiko Nishimura as Tokugawa Ieyasu
Joe Shishido as Honda Masanobu
Naoya Makoto as Ishikawa Kazumasa
Ryū Manatsu as Sakai Tadatsugu

Others
Hidekazu Akai as Ishikawa Goemon - best friend of Hideyoshi
Mayo Suzukaze as Otaki - wife of Goemon
Tatsuya Nakadai as Sen no Rikyū - a tea master
Kōji Tamaki as Ashikaga Yoshiaki - the 15th and last shogun of the Ashikaga shogunate
Aki Yashiro as Osen
Osamu Saka as Satomura Joha
Terry O'Brien as Luís Fróis
Masakane Yonekura as Imagawa Yoshimoto
Ryūnosuke Kaneda as Saitō Dōsan
Kiyoshi Nakajō as Ankokuji Ekei

TV schedule

Broadcasting in the United States
Circa 1997–98, New Jersey Network would air the show subtitled in English on Sunday evenings at 11:00pm EST. However, there is no physical domestic release of this series on VHS or DVD.

References

External links

Taiga drama
1996 Japanese television series debuts
1996 Japanese television series endings
Cultural depictions of Akechi Mitsuhide
Cultural depictions of Oda Nobunaga
Cultural depictions of Tokugawa Ieyasu
Cultural depictions of Toyotomi Hideyoshi
Jidaigeki
Television shows based on Japanese novels
Television series set in the 16th century